Yuancheng ( is the only district of the city of Heyuan, Guangdong Province, China.

County-level divisions of Guangdong
Heyuan